Tarom (also Romanized as Ţārom; also known as Tarum) is a village in Tarom Rural District, in the Central District of Hajjiabad County, Hormozgan Province, Iran. At the 2006 census, its population was 884, in 209 families.

References 

Populated places in Hajjiabad County